Visaji Krushna Chinchalkar, popularly known as Visaji Pant Biniwale, was one of the leading generals of Peshwas in Northern India during 1759 to 1772. Peshwa Madhavrao I mainly sought his assistance in his attempt to restore Maratha Empire in the North after the defeat in the Battle of Panipat (1761).

Early life 
Visaji Krushna was born in a Karhade Brahmin family having surname ‘Chinchalkar’. There is no mention as to his year of birth, however, it must be around 1730. He got the title ‘Biniwale’ (which means a person at the front) during his career as a Military General since his troops would remain at the front of the Maratha army during battles.

Military career 
On 10 October 1759, Visaji Krushna defeated Nizam's troops and conquered the fort of Ahmednagar. In 1760–1761, he fought in the Panipat war under the leadership of Sadashivrao Bhau. In 1769, he marched towards Udaipur along with his senior Ramchandra Ganesh Kanade. The Rajputs there agreed to pay him Rs.60 lakhs in the tribute. On 5 April 1770, he defeated Jats of Haryana. On October 1770 he vanquished Najib Khan Rohilla, the main opponent of the Battle of Panipat (1761). In November 1771, he was appointed ‘In Charge of the Northern front of Marathas’ by Peshwa Madhavrao I. In February 1772, along with Mahadji Shinde, he overpowered the Rohilkhand at Shukratal by defeating Zabita Khan. He avenged the defeat of Panipat by breaking the tomb of Najib Khan, by looting the artillery and wealth of the Rohillas and by recovering from them an additional tribute of Rs.40 lakhs.

Honor by Peshwa Madhavrao 
Peshwa Madhavrao I was so delighted with Visaji Krushna's grand victory in the Rohilkhand that he specifically mentioned in his written will to shower golden flowers on him during his arrival at the border of Pune.

Later life and death 
When Visaji Krushna arrived to Pune from North, he brought with him huge jewelry and cash of not less than Rs.22 lakhs. Meanwhile, Peshwa Madhavrao I had died and Peshwa Narayanrao was murdered. Hence, Visaji Krushna was welcomed by Peshwa Raghunath Rao and he was showered with the golden flowers as wished by Peshwa Madhavrao I in his will.
Upon realising Raghunath Rao's involvement in Narayanrao's murder, Visaji Krushna joined hands with ‘Nana Phadnis’ to restore Peshwa Sawai Madhavrao on the Peshwa throne.
There is no reference found as to his date of death and cause thereof, so, presumably, it was not on the battlefield.

References 
‘Marathi Riyasat Volume V’ (Marathi) by Govind Sakharam Sardesai
‘Marathi Riyasat Volume VI’ (Marathi) by Govind Sakharam Sardesai
‘Peshvyanchi Bakhar’ (Marathi) Editorial notes by R.V.Herwadkar

Indian military leaders
People from Maharashtra